Louis Ferrari (1910–1987) was an Italian musette accordionist and composer who was active in France beginning in the 1930s. He established the Ferrari & Son Ensemble which played in Parisian clubs. Louis Ferrari was also the cousin of jazz accordionist Tony Muréna. His song Domino with French lyrics by Jacques Plante and English lyrics by Don Raye was popularized by singers including Bing Crosby, Doris Day, Tony Martin and Andy Williams.

Works
Selected works include:
Domino (1951)
Tonnerre d'Amour
La varenne
N'oublie Jamais (I Can't Forget)
Soir de Paris

Ferrari was also featured on a number of recordings.

References

Jazz accordionists
Italian accordionists
Folk jazz musicians
Italian male composers
1910 births
1988 deaths
20th-century Italian composers
20th-century accordionists
20th-century Italian male musicians
Male jazz musicians